Namse Bangdzod was a 1,950-ton Indonesian cargo ship-oil tanker that went missing on 28 December 2018. The ship was departed on 27 December with 1 million liters of crude palm oil (CPO) from Sampit, Central Kalimantan towards the Port of Tanjung Priok, Jakarta. She was manned by the 12 crewmembers and a captain, who were last-contacted in the early hours of 28 December.

Namse Bangdzod was expected to arrive within a few days, but authorities lost communication in the coastal area the next day on 28 December 2018, and her whereabouts have never been confirmed.

Disappearance 
As the ship was sailing on the pre-planned route between 27 to 28 December, the Indonesian Navy recorded changing positions at multiple times via her automatic identification system, but Namse Bangdzods whereabouts have never been ascertained after last signal was received. Later, the National Search and Rescue Agency acknowledged that the disappearance of the tanker probably began with a pirate hijack, leading to an unexpected disappearance along with eleven crewmembers and a captain. Her status was officially declared missing on 27 January 2019.

Later development 
Maritime transport experts, Indonesian navy, and other official stated various reasons of Namse Bangdzods disappearance. Maritime declined the presumed-sunk-claims citing, "It is unlikely that the vessel was adrift at sea as the Navy had found no sign of it". The Indonesian navy has also refused to acknowledge the hijacking-claims as they believed the route has no history of piracy and is considered as the safe one.

Indonesian authorities conducted a massive search to find the missing vessel. The search included four warships around the Java Sea, as well as maritime patrol aircraft from Surabaya to the central part of the country. Despite months-long massive searches, it was declared missing on 27 January 2019.

References 

1993 ships
Maritime incidents in 2018
2018 in Indonesia
History of Indonesia
Merchant ships of Indonesia
Ships built in Japan